(H-day), today usually called "", was on 3 September 1967, the day in which Sweden switched from driving on the left-hand side of the road to the right. The "H" stands for "Högertrafik", the Swedish word for right-hand traffic. It was by far the largest logistical event in Sweden's history.

Background
There were various arguments for the change:
All neighbouring countries drive on the right, including Norway and Finland, with which Sweden shares land borders, with five million vehicles crossing annually.
Approximately 90 percent of Swedes drove left-hand drive vehicles, and this led to many head-on collisions when passing on narrow two-lane highways. City buses were among the very few vehicles that conformed to the normal opposite-steering wheel rule, being right-hand drive (RHD).

However, the change was unpopular; in a 1955 referendum, 83 percent voted to keep driving on the left. Nevertheless, the Swedish Parliament approved Prime Minister Tage Erlander's proposal on 10 May 1963 of right hand traffic beginning in 1967, as the number of cars on the road tripled from 500,000 to 1.5 million and was expected to reach 2.8 million by 1975. The Statens Högertrafikkommission (HTK) ("the state right-hand traffic commission") was established to oversee the change. It also began implementing a four-year education programme on the advice of psychologists.

The campaign included displaying the Dagen H logo on various commemorative items, including milk cartons and underwear. Swedish television held a contest for songs about the change, and the winning entry was "Håll dig till höger, Svensson" ('Keep to the right, Svensson') written by Expressen journalist Peter Himmelstrand and performed by The Telstars.

As Dagen H neared, every intersection was equipped with an extra set of poles and traffic signals wrapped in black plastic. Workers roamed the streets early in the morning on Dagen H to remove the plastic. A parallel set of lines was painted on the roads with white paint, then covered with black tape. Before Dagen H, Swedish roads had used yellow lines. Approximately 350,000 signs had to be removed or replaced, including some 20,000 in Stockholm alone.

Vehicles had to have their original left-hand-traffic headlamps replaced with right-traffic units. One of the reasons the Riksdag pushed ahead with Dagen H despite public unpopularity was that most vehicles in Sweden at the time used inexpensive, standard-size round headlamps, but the trend towards more expensive model-specific headlamps had begun in Continental Europe and was expected to spread through most other parts of the world. Further delay in changing over from left- to right-hand traffic would have greatly increased the cost burden to vehicle owners.

The switch
On Dagen H, Sunday, 3 September 1967, all non-essential traffic was banned from the roads from 01:00 to 06:00. Any vehicles on the roads during that time had to follow special rules. All vehicles had to come to a complete stop at 04:50, then carefully change to the right-hand side of the road and stop again (to give others time to switch sides of the road and avoid a head-on collision) before being allowed to proceed at 05:00. In Stockholm and Malmö, however, the ban was longerfrom 10:00 on Saturday until 15:00 on Sundayto allow work crews to reconfigure intersections. Certain other towns also saw an extended ban, from 15:00 on Saturday until 15:00 on Sunday.

One-way streets presented unique problems. Bus stops had to be constructed on the other side of the street. Intersections had to be reshaped to allow traffic to merge.

Results 
The relatively smooth changeover saw a temporary reduction in the number of accidents. On the day of the change, only 157 minor accidents were reported, of which only 32 involved personal injuries, with only a low number being serious. On the Monday following Dagen H, there were 125 reported traffic accidents, compared to a range of 130 to 198 for previous Mondays, none of them fatal. Experts suggested that changing to driving on the right reduced accidents while overtaking, as people already drove left-hand drive vehicles, thereby having a better view of the road ahead; additionally, the change made a marked surge in perceived risk that exceeded the target level and thus was followed by very cautious behaviour that caused a major decrease in road fatalities. Indeed, fatal car-to-car and car-to-pedestrian accidents dropped sharply as a result, and the number of motor insurance claims went down by 40%.

These initial improvements did not last, however. The number of motor insurance claims returned to "normal" over the next six weeks and, by 1969, the accident rates were back to the levels seen before the change.

Trams in central Stockholm, in Helsingborg and most lines in Malmö (which ultimately abolished its tram system in 1973) were withdrawn and replaced by buses, and over one thousand new buses were purchased with doors on the right-hand side. Some 8,000 older buses were retrofitted to provide doors on both sides, while Gothenburg and Malmö exported their left-traffic buses to Pakistan and Kenya. 

Although all road traffic in Sweden changed to the right-hand side, railways and metro systems did not switch to the new rule and continued to drive on the left, with the exception of tram systems. Additionally, many of them were abandoned as a result of Dagen H; only the trams in Norrköping and Gothenburg and three suburban lines in the Stockholm area (Nockebybanan and Lidingöbanan) survived. Gothenburg faced high costs for reconfiguring trams, while Stockholm's budget only covered purchasing new buses, since the remaining lines had bidirectional trams with doors on both sides. In any event, most trams in Stockholm were replaced by the metro, a decision made long before the Dagen H decision.

Fellow Nordic country Iceland changed to driving on the right in May 1968, on a day known as H-dagurinn.

See also
730 (transport)
Switch to right-hand traffic in Czechoslovakia
Transport in Sweden

References

External links

Television coverage of changeover, Sveriges Television
The Day Sweden Turned Right, BBC World Service, 2 September 2016
Border crossing between Sweden and Finland, 1967
"A 'thrilling' mission to get the Swedish to change overnight", BBC, 18 April 2018

Traffic law
Transport in Sweden
1967 in Sweden
1967 in transport
Driving in Sweden